The Indonesian Volleyball Federation, commonly called PBVSI (Indonesian: Persatuan Bola Voli Seluruh Indonesia) sometimes translated as All-Indonesian Volleyball Association) is the governing body of volleyball and beach volleyball in Indonesia. Formed in 1955, its headquarters are in Pancoran, South Jakarta. The PBVSI is a member of the International Volleyball Federation (FIVB) and the Asian Volleyball Confederation (AVC), as well as the volleyball sports in the National Sports Committee of Indonesia. It organizes both the Men's Pro Liga and women's Pro Liga. The organization also administrates the Indonesia Men's Volleyball Team and the Indonesia Women's Volleyball Team.

History 
In 1953, after the third Indonesia National Sports Week was completed, the Executive Board of Surabaya Volleyball Association (Indonesian:Ikatan Perhimpunan Volleyball Surabaya, I.P.V.O.S) held a management meeting around the middle of 1954.

In the IPVOS meeting, ideas or decisions were made to form a national volleyball parent organization.

In order to realize this idea, the IPVOS board finally sent someone to meet with the board of the Indonesian Olympic Committee in Jakarta.

References

External links 

 Official website

National members of the Asian Volleyball Confederation
Volleyball
Volleyball in Indonesia